Ken Shuttleworth (born September 1952 in Birmingham) is an English architect.

Shuttleworth studied architecture at the Leicester School of Architecture, De Montfort University, where his fluid draftsmanship earned him the nickname "Ken the Pen".

Shuttleworth became a partner at Foster and Partners where he worked on some of the world's most iconic buildings. He joined the practice in 1977, moving to Hong Kong in 1979 to oversee the design and construction of The Hongkong and Shanghai Banking Corporation’s headquarters. Returning to the UK in 1986, he proceeded to build up a diverse portfolio of experience including the Carré d'Art in Nîmes, the ITN building in London, Cranfield University Library, Hong Kong’s Chek Lap Kok airport, the Al Faisaliah development in Riyadh, London’s Millennium Bridge, 30 St Mary Axe ('The Gherkin’) and City Hall.

Shuttleworth left Foster and Partners to set up his own practice, Make Architects, in 2004. The practice has completed a number of award-winning buildings which include the City of London Information Centre, the 55 Baker Street office development, Grosvenor Waterside and 10 Weymouth Street residential schemes, all in central London. Other completed projects in the UK include The Cube in Birmingham, the Montpellier Chapter hotel in Cheltenham, the Oxford Molecular Pathology Institute for the University of Oxford, and the Handball Arena for the London 2012 Olympics, known as the Copper Box.

Projects currently under construction include the Thomas Clarkson Community College in Cambridgeshire, a student housing scheme in Hammersmith, a children’s hospital in Kurdistan, a boutique hotel in China and a residential tower in Hong Kong.

Shuttleworth and members of his staff appeared in the final of the UK 2007 edition of The Apprentice, where they advised the two remaining contestants on designing an iconic building for London's South Bank.

Ken Shuttleworth was a commissioner of the Commission for Architecture and the Built Environment (CABE) from 2004–2011 - an executive non-departmental public body of the UK government which promoted better design and design education.

Projects on which Shuttleworth has worked
At Make Architects
 The Cube, Birmingham
 The Thomas Clarkson Community College, Cambridgeshire
 City of London Information Centre
 5 Broadgate, London
 55 Baker Street, London
 The Aspire sculpture, University of Nottingham
 The Gateway Building, University of Nottingham
 The Jubilee Campus extension, University of Nottingham
 Old Road Campus Research Building, University of Oxford
 Oxford Molecular Pathology Institute, University of Oxford
 London 2012 Olympic Handball Arena
 The Montpellier Chapter, Cheltenham 
 The former Hammersmith Palais, London
 Grosvenor Waterside, London
 10 Weymouth Street, London

At Foster and Partners
 City Hall, London
 The Arch at Wembley Stadium, London
 Chek Lap Kok airport, Hong Kong
 The Commerzbank Tower, Frankfurt
 30 St Mary Axe ('The Gherkin'), London
 The Millennium Bridge, London
 The Hongkong and Shanghai Banking Corporation headquarters, Hong Kong
 Citibank's headquarters, London
 Kings Norton Library, Cranfield University

References

 Guardian biography of Ken Shuttleworth
  Jubilee Campus, Nottingham by Make
 CTBUH profile on Ken Shuttleworth
 Ecobuild profile on Ken Shuttleworth

External links
 Make Architects, Shuttleworth's new practice
 Interview in the LEaf Review
 Interview with Ken Shuttleworth (video)
 

1952 births
Living people
Architects from Birmingham, West Midlands
Alumni of De Montfort University